Al Jumum is a governorate in Makkah Province, in western Saudi Arabia. The Expedition of Zaid ibn Haritha in al-Jumum took place in September, 627AD, 6AH of the Islamic calendar at this location during the era of the Islamic prophet, Muhammad.

See also 

 List of cities and towns in Saudi Arabia
 Regions of Saudi Arabia
List of battles of Muhammad

References

Populated places in Mecca Province